Ryan Michael Bowman (born 30 November 1991) is an English professional footballer who is a product of the Carlisle United Academy currently playing as a striker for  club Shrewsbury Town. The Carlisle United product joined Wokington on loan in 2010 and eventually left Carlisle to join Darlington the year after where he played his football for a season. The forward enjoyed seasons at Hereford United , York City, Tourquay United and Gateshead before earning a move to Scottish Premiership side Motherwell where he spent 3 years. In 2019 Bowman joined Exeter City, after scoring an impressive 32 goals Bowman earned a move to League One club Shrewsbury Town.

Career

Carlisle United
Bowman was born in Carlisle, Cumbria. He started his career with hometown club Carlisle United, first being part of the Centre of Excellence before signing a Youth Training Scheme contract in 2008. He scored 22 goals in his second season at youth level to make him the top scorer for the under-18 team. After also impressing for the reserve team, Bowman joined Conference North club Workington on a one-month loan on 13 February 2010. He scored his first goal in the 1–0 win against Redditch United on 27 February 2010, with a volley in the fourth minute. Bowman scored two goals in 10 matches on loan with Workington before being recalled by Carlisle due to injuries. He made his first-team debut for Carlisle in a 3–1 victory at home to Bristol Rovers in League One on 2 April 2010, coming on as a substitute for Scott Dobie in the 89th minute. He made six appearances for Carlisle in the 2009–10 season. He was given the club's Youth Training Scheme Player of the Year award, and during the summer of 2010 signed a one-year professional contract.

On 19 October 2010, Bowman rejoined Workington on a one-month loan, and finished his second spell without scoring in eight appearances. The following calendar year on 1 January 2011, Bowman made his first appearance of 2010–11 for Carlisle, coming off the substitutes' bench in the 79th minute to replace Craig Curran in a 2–2 home draw with Huddersfield Town. He made two further substitute appearances in 2010–11 before being released by Carlisle on 4 May 2011.

Darlington
After impressing on trial, Bowman signed for Conference Premier club Darlington on 4 August 2011 on a sixth-month contract. He made his debut for Darlington in a 1–0 home win over Braintree Town on 13 August 2011, before scoring his first two goals on 29 August in a 3–1 victory over Lincoln City. The first came after 29 seconds with a drilled low shot and scored the second from 17 yards, before assisting the third goal for John Campbell after pouncing on Joe Anyon's misplaced pass. On 29 October 2011, he scored his first ever goal in the FA Cup, during a 1–1 draw in the fourth qualifying round against Hinckley United.

Darlington suffered financial difficulties during Bowman's time at the club and his contract was terminated on 16 January 2012, along with the rest of the playing squad and caretaker manager Craig Liddle, though the club retained their registrations so they were eligible to play on a non-contract basis. Bowman ended a run of 17 league matches without a goal after he scored the opening goal in the 3–1 loss away at Alfreton Town on 18 February 2012. He scored his last two goals for Darlington in the 3–1 home victory against Kettering Town on the final day of 2011–12 on 28 April 2012. Bowman scored 11 goals in 42 appearances as Darlington finished the season in the relegation zone, with the club being demoted to the Northern League.

Hereford United
After a short trial with Hereford United, Bowman signed for the Conference Premier club on 24 July 2012 on a one-year contract. Manager Martin Foyle commented that "I just feel that's the type of player I'll have. Someone who is keen, hungry and who feels they have got a point to prove." Bowman made a scoring debut with Hereford's last goal in the 89th minute of a 4–2 win at home to Ebbsfleet United on 25 August 2012. He scored two goals in Hereford's 3–1 home victory over League One team Shrewsbury Town in the FA Cup first round on 3 November 2012. He finished 2012–13 as Hereford's top scorer with 19 goals from 43 appearances.

York City

Having been offered a new contract by Hereford, Bowman signed for League Two club York City on 24 May 2013 on a two-year contract. With him being under 23 years of age, York would pay Hereford a compensation fee, which was set at £20,000 by a tribunal. Bowman made his debut as a 78th-minute substitute for Sander Puri in a 1–0 victory over Northampton Town on 3 August 2013, in the first match of 2013–14. His first goals for York came with two headers in a 2–2 away draw with Cheltenham Town on 2 November 2013. Bowman played in both play-off matches against Fleetwood Town, entering the first as a 62nd-minute substitute for Ryan Brobbel and starting the second, although York were eliminated 1–0 on aggregate. He finished 2013–14 with 43 appearances and eight goals.

Torquay United
Despite having one year remaining on his contract at York, Bowman was allowed to sign for newly relegated Conference Premier club Torquay United on 3 July 2014 on a two-year contract.

Gateshead
Bowman signed for Torquay's National League rivals Gateshead on 17 July 2015 for an undisclosed fee.

Motherwell
Bowman signed for Scottish Premiership club Motherwell on 31 August 2016 on a two-year contract for an undisclosed fee. He made his debut on 10 September 2016, as Motherwell drew 1–1 away to Ross County.

Exeter City
Bowman signed for League Two club Exeter City on 2 January 2019 for an undisclosed nominal fee as a replacement for Jayden Stockley, who was expected to leave the club.

Shrewsbury Town
On 17 June 2021, Bowman joined League One side Shrewsbury Town on a two-year deal, with the option of a further year. He scored his first goal for the club on 18 September in a 1–1 draw against Sheffield Wednesday at Hillsborough. On 9 October, during a League One fixture against Ipswich Town at Portman Road, Bowman was substituted after 35 minutes after experiencing palpitations. After being assessed by medical staff from both sides, he was taken to Ipswich Hospital for checks and was later discharged. On 23 October, Bowman scored a hat-trick in a 4–1 win at home to Cambridge United. In June 2022, Bowman underwent an ablation heart surgery to treat irregular rhythms.

Career statistics

References

External links

Profile at the Shrewsbury Town F.C. website

1991 births
Living people
Footballers from Carlisle, Cumbria
English footballers
Association football forwards
Carlisle United F.C. players
Workington A.F.C. players
Darlington F.C. players
Hereford United F.C. players
York City F.C. players
Torquay United F.C. players
Gateshead F.C. players
Motherwell F.C. players
Exeter City F.C. players
Shrewsbury Town F.C. players
National League (English football) players
English Football League players
Scottish Professional Football League players